Alice Louise Judd Simpich (1918–2006), also known as Awee Simpich was an American sculptor.  She was born in Honolulu on March 1, 1918, and graduated from Sarah Lawrence College in 1940.  Simpich is best known for her sensitive portrait busts.  In addition to being a sculptor, she was an active member and supporter of the Maui Humane Society.  Simpich died at age 87 on January 21, 2006.  Her carved stone portrait bust Head of a Young Woman, ca. 1953 is installed in the John Dominis and Patches Damon Holt Gallery of the Honolulu Museum of Art.

References
 Honolulu Star Bulletin, “Alice Louise Judd Simpich”, January 25, 2006.
 Papanikolas, Theresa and DeSoto Brown, Art Deco Hawai'i, Honolulu, Honolulu Museum of Art, 2014, p. 123

Footnotes

External links
 Art Inventories Catalog, Smithsonian American Art Museum

American women sculptors
Sarah Lawrence College alumni
1918 births
2006 deaths
Sculptors from Hawaii
20th-century American sculptors
20th-century American women artists
21st-century American women